Luis David Martínez and Gonçalo Oliveira were the defending champions but lost in the semifinals to Evan King and Max Schnur.

Diego Hidalgo and Nicolás Jarry won the title after defeating King and Schnur 6–3, 5–7, [10–6] in the final.

Seeds

Draw

References

External links
 Main draw

Challenger de Santiago II - Doubles
2021 Doubles